Ouagadou is a commune in the Cercle of Nara in the Koulikoro Region of south-western Mali. The commune contains the town of Goumbou which is the administrative centre and 6 villages. In the 2009 census the commune had a population of 19,123. Goumbou is 28 km southwest of Nara, the administrative centre (chef-lieu) of the cercle.

Sister city 
  Vegas del Genil, Spain

References

External links
.

Communes of Koulikoro Region